Sedgwick County Memorial Hall and Soldiers and Sailors Monument (1911–13) is a Civil War monument on the grounds of the Old Sedgwick County Courthouse, in Wichita, Kansas. It was designed by E. M. Viquesney, with sculpture by Frederick Hibbard and the W. H. Mullins Manufacturing Company.
The idea to construct a memorial to Sedgwick County Civil War veterans began with two local GAR posts in 1904, but sufficient funds were not available until in 1911. In that year the Kansas State Legislature passed a one-time county tax levy to fund the building of monuments in counties with a population of over 72,000.

The monument consists of a Second Empire granite pavilion adorned with five statues.  Its dome is crowned by a hammered copper figure of Liberty holding a flag and a laurel wreath, made by the W. H. Mullins Company of Salem, Ohio. At the base of the dome are four life-sized bronze figures by Hibbard representing the Infantry, Cavalry, Artillery, and Navy. Inscriptions on the monument's four facades list the battles, dates and locations in which local soldiers fought. The Liberty figure originally faced the courthouse, but after its installation the veterans decided that the statue should face outward. Rotating it 180 degrees delayed the monument's dedication from Lincoln's Birthday to Flag Day. The monument's interior features a Memorial Hall, 12 feet square, with two marble-and-glass cases displaying war relics. The Hall remained locked for 25 years because the key had been lost. The key was found again in 1948. 

The monument was dedicated June 14, 1913. It was restored (2000–01), and rededicated on Veterans Day, November 11, 2001.

See also
 1913 in art
 National Register of Historic Places listings in Sedgwick County, Kansas

References

1913 sculptures
Allegorical sculptures in the United States
Bronze sculptures in Kansas
Buildings and structures completed in 1913
Copper sculptures in the United States
Granite sculptures in the United States
Monuments and memorials on the National Register of Historic Places in Kansas
National Register of Historic Places in Sedgwick County, Kansas
Sculptures of men in Kansas
Sculptures of women in Kansas
Union (American Civil War) monuments and memorials